.lgbt is a sponsored top-level domain for the LGBT community, sponsored by Identity Digital. The domain name was delegated to the Root Zone on 18 July 2014. The creation of .lgbt is meant to promote diversity and LGBT businesses, and is open to LGBT businesses, organizations, and anyone wishing to reach the LGBT community.

The first
PinkNews and Out Now Consulting were among the first to launch .lgbt websites.

References

 

Generic top-level domains
Council of European National Top Level Domain Registries members
Computer-related introductions in 2014
LGBT and society